Isaak Yakovlevich Mazel (December 1911, Minsk – March 31, 1945, Tashkent) was a Belarusian–Russian  chess master.

He tied for 8-9th at Moscow 1931 (the 7th USSR Chess Championship, Mikhail Botvinnik won), tied for 15-16th at Leningrad 1934 (the 9th USSR-ch, Grigory Levenfish and Ilya Rabinovich won).

He shared 2nd, behind Nikolai Riumin, in Moscow City Chess Championship in 1933/34,
tied for 9-12th at Moscow 1936 (the 4th Trade Unions ch, Georgy Lisitsin and Vitaly Chekhover won), and won ahead of Vladimirs Petrovs in Moscow City-ch in 1941/42.

References

External links 

1911 births
1945 deaths
Chess players from Minsk
Belarusian Jews
Russian Jews
Russian chess players
Soviet chess players
Jewish chess players
20th-century chess players